James Walker (12 May 1883 – 5 January 1945) was a Labour Party politician.

At Ruskin College he gained distinction in economics and social science. For years he was organiser of the Steel Smelters Society, and for many years a member of Glasgow Town Council. Walker became Member of Parliament (MP) in 1929, representing the Newport constituency in Monmouthshire from 1929 to 1931 and Motherwell from 1935 until he was knocked down and killed by an Army lorry in Brighton, in 1945, aged 61. At the time of his death, Walker was Political Secretary of the Iron and Steel Trades Confederation.

References

External links 
 

1883 births
1945 deaths
Welsh Labour Party MPs
Politics of Newport, Wales
Iron and Steel Trades Confederation-sponsored MPs
Members of the Parliament of the United Kingdom for Scottish constituencies
UK MPs 1935–1945
Chairs of the Labour Party (UK)
Road incident deaths in England